Stanton by Dale, also written as Stanton-by-Dale, is a village and civil parish in the south east of Derbyshire, England. According to the University of Nottingham English Place-names project, the settlement name Stanton-by-Dale could mean 'Stony farm or settlement', stān (Old English) for stone or rock; and
tūn (Old English) for an enclosure; farmstead; village; or an estate. Since 1974 it has been part of the Erewash borough. The village is halfway between the cities of Derby  and Nottingham , as the crow flies, from each city. The population of the civil parish at the 2011 census was 505.

Early history
Mentioned in the Domesday Book Survey of 1086, Stanton-by-Dale is believed to derive its name from stone quarrying in the area.

During the 13th and 14th centuries the church and much land in the parish was owned by nearby Dale (Stanley Park) Abbey. After its dissolution in 1538, the Abbey's property in Stanton was granted to the Babington family. In Elizabethan times, this was sold on to Michael Willoughby of Risley. Many local buildings contain stone which originated as part of the Abbey.

St Michael's Church dates from about 1300, although it is not certain whether there was an earlier church on this site. The tower is fifteenth century.

Stanton and the Ironworks
Earl Stanhope became Lord of the Manor in the eighteenth Century, eventually selling the parish to the Stanton Ironworks Company.

Only workers at the Ironworks, a major local employer which dominated the area for over two centuries, were allowed to live in Stanton owned properties. In later years these houses were all painted 'Stanton Green', a colour still evident in the village.

Stanton Ironworks became an international company as Stanton & Staveley, was nationalised as part of British Steel Corporation, de-nationalised and sold eventually to the French Saint-Gobain company. Production ceased at the works in 2007. It is commemorated throughout the UK and further afield by the many thousands of manhole covers and concrete street lamp standards bearing the words ’Stanton’ or ’Stanton and Staveley’.

Sport

Golf
Erewash Valley Golf Club, founded in 1905, is an 18 hole course set in 165 acres of prime parkland. It has a 16 acre practice area adjacent to the clubhouse as well as putting greens. In 2008 the clubhouse was vastly extended to allow for two bar restaurant areas, a new and enlarged locker and changing rooms.

Cricket
Stanton-by-Dale Cricket Club has a long history of recreational cricket dating back to 1868. However, there is a report of a game between Stanton-by-Dale and Sandiacre dating back to 1848. Stanton-by-Dale CC is based at the end of School Lane on Crompton Ground, to the west of the village and filed two senior teams in the Derbyshire County Cricket League.

See also
Listed buildings in Stanton by Dale

References

External links

 Stanton Ironworks archive
 Archive film - Stanton Ironworks in 1959 YouTube clip

Some of the villagers have produced a video describing a proposed 4000 house development and the associated planned access across green belt land. These plans were thrown into uncertainty again recently (Autumn 2008).
 A road to ruin - Protesters' Youtube clip
 Current Planning Applications

Villages in Derbyshire
Civil parishes in Derbyshire
Borough of Erewash